Sarabhai vs Sarabhai is an Indian sitcom created and produced by  Jamnadas Majethia and Aatish Kapadia.It features a quintessential upper-class family in Mumbai.

Characters

Principal characters

Indravardan Sarabhai
A.k.a. Indu, who is an ex-director of a multinational company. He retired early to take care of the children and help his wife work as a social worker. He is Maya's husband and Sahil, Sonia and Rosesh's father, Vallavdas and Pankor's son, Ila's brother and Arnab's Grandfather. He is arguably one of the funniest characters in the show who doesn't hesitate to make a joke about something/someone even in the worst of situations. He constantly makes fun of Maya and plays tricks on her but still loves her a lot, he has a fun and friendly rapport with his elder son Sahil, he also loves his daughter Soniya, but makes fun of his younger son, Rosesh, irritating him on various occasions, while he still loves him. He also shares a playful rapport with his daughter in law, Monisha and sides with her during her and Maya's confrontations. He gets irritated by his son in law, Dushyant and his sister's husband, Madhusudhan.

Maya Mazumdar Sarabhai
She is the matriarch of the Sarabhai family, and runs the household with a tight grip. Being a snooty upper-class socialite, her daughter-in-law Monisha's middle-class money-saving techniques and unkempt behaviour is a constant pet peeve for her. Indravardhan's wife, Sahil, Sonia and Rosesh's mother, Arnab's grandmother.

Dr. Sahil Sarabhai
A cosmetic surgeon. He is the eldest child, and the normal one. He is calm, wise, and noble, and is constantly trying to resolve various conflicts in his family. Maya and Indravardhan's elder son, Sonia and Rosesh's elder brother, Monisha's husband and Arnab's father. When he was a child, Indravardan revealed that Sahil always used to be the hero whenever they used to act.

Monisha (née Manisha) Singh Sarabhai
A middle class, Punjabi girl from Noida, and now the daughter-in-law of the Sarabhai's. She rarely cleans the house and is always lazing around watching daily soaps on the television. She develops a dramatic nature from these shows. Sahil's wife and Arnab's mother. Her passion is to save money, in every situation. She is always at loggerheads with Maya for her thrifty ways. Her father-in-law always supports her, while Sahil is torn between the two. Despite being careless, Monisha is an honest, innocent, and a loving woman. Manisha was named Monisha by Maya as she found the name Manisha 'too middle-class'.

Rosesh Sarabhai
26 years old child of Maya and Indravadan. He is a theatre artist, aspiring actor, and a poet. Maya and Indravardhan's younger son, Sahil and Sonia's younger brother, Jasmine's love interest. He speaks very oddly, and Sahil and Indravardan always compare his voice with animals like ducks and machines like a mixer. Indravardan always trolls Rosesh for being a momma's boy, yet he loves him and it is proven by the fact that whenever Rosesh is in danger, he is ready to help him.

Arnab Sarabhai
Arnab "Guddu" Sarabhai is the heir to the Sarabhais. Sahil and Monisha's son.

Recurring characters
Most episodes involve the five members of the immediate family. Members of the extended family, and friends, make regular appearances and some episode plots are centred around them as well.

Sonya Sarabhai Painter
Sonya (played by Kshitee Jog / Shital Thakkar in season 1; Aishwarya Sakhuja in season 2). Maya and Indravardhan's daughter, Sahil's younger sister, Rosesh's elder sister and Dushyant's wife. She exhibits some of Maya's socialite attitude and can see future through some techniques which is often a trouble for the Sarabhais.

Dushyant Painter
Sonia's husband. He is much despised by the rest of the family, even by the normally affable Monisha. He has a morbid fascination for various electronic appliances from toasters to tube lights to refrigerators to lifts and loves to explain stuffs about them whenever he finds a chance, which irritates the rest of the people.

Jasmine Mavani
Jasmine, played by Vaibhavi Upadhyaya, is Madhusudan's distant relative, and a singer and theatre artist. Rosesh's love interest. Maya disapproves of her accent and her poor English.

Ila
Pankor's daughter, Indravadan's sister and Madhusudan's wife. She often visits Indravadan & Maya, and helps them sort their daily troubles. She is a sweet, lively person who is extremely tolerant with her deaf husband and is the only one able to communicate with him through hand gestures.

Madhusudan/Madhubhai
He was an ex freedom fighter. He is hard of hearing, and refuses to use a hearing aid. Ila's husband. He usually does not acknowledge the fact that he cannot hear, blames others for speaking too softly, and repeatedly asks questions. He is particularly bothersome to Indu and interjects almost always with a "hain?". A lot of humour is derived from his misinterpretations and the difficulty that people have in explaining things to him, which only his wife Ila, and his niece Kismi are able to do.

Pankor Sarabhai ("Baa")
Pankorben Sarabhai (affectionately known as "Baa"), played by Tarla Joshi, is the mother of Indravadan and Ilaben. She died five years before the show began. She is often mentioned by Maya and Indu, and appears in flashback scenes. She ridicules Maya for being snooty and "high-society", and always rebukes Indravadhan for his choice to marry her.

Other characters include the maid Radha bai, their servant Vitthal (played by Ghanashyam Nayak), Maya's socialite friends Baldev (played by Gurpal Singh) and Sarupa Singh, her best friend Sarita and her husband Dinesh, and Maya's NRI sisters, Vidisha (played by Usha Bachani), a single socialite, and Nayesha who is married to Monisha's cousin Jugal Kishore (played by Gireesh Sahedev), as well as Madhusudan's niece, Kismi (played by Bhamini Oza Gandhi)

Guest

Season 1
 Yatin Karyekar as writer Nagesh Iyer in Sahil In A book(Pilot)
 Kishwer Merchant as Dr. Kiran in Husbands Do Not Cheat 
 Usha Bachani as Vidisha in Maya's Cleanliness Drive
 Mandira Bedi as Cookie Sharma in Indravadhan's Fantasies, Foiled
Deepali sayad as maggi (Matsigandha) "Rosesh Is In Love"
 Manini Mishra as Dinky Chakravarthy in Sahil's Personal Diary
 The Khichdi (TV series) Family from the Khichdi Crossover Episode ( Khichdi With Sarabhais of Sarabhai vs Sarabhai and Episode 25 of Instant Khichdi).
 Mallika Sherawat as Sunehri to promote her movie Bachke Rehna Re Baba in Sarabhais With Sunehri
 Vaishali Thakkar as Neelima Verma in Nilima And Sahil
 Parvin Dabas as Sudhanshu Khan in Sudhanshu Paints Maya and Maya And Sudhanshu
 Makrand Deshpande as the hypnotist Siddharth in Indravadan Hypnotized Part 1 and Indravadan Hypnotized Part 2
 Roop Kumar Rathod & Sunali Rathod as themselves in Maya, Monisha And Antakshari
 Jimit Trivedi
 Aamir Ali as Patang Mahajan in Monisha's Date With Actor Karan
 Aatish Kapadia as the poet Anirudh Mehta urf "Kachcha Kela" in Episode 53 
 Parmeet Sethi as Detective Omkar Nath to promote the Star One show D.O.N. in  The Midas Chang's Magic
 Shilpa Mehta as Maya's socialite friend Sarita, seen in many episodes.
 Rohitash Gaud as Mr. Cindolin, the mystic who shows Sarabhai family their future in Crystal Ball Time.
 Bhamini Oza Gandhi as Kissme, Madhusudhan's niece and Rita
 Sanat Vyas as Dr. Acharya (Original)

Season 2
 Aatish Kapadia as the poet Anirudh Mehta urf "Kachcha Kela" in Episode 6 & 8
 Vishal Gandhi as "Bahu Machhar Beta Khachhar" Director in Episode 9
 Jamnadas Majethia as Prahlad in Episode 9
 Sameksha Singh as Arnab's Teacher Ms. Pochkanwala
 Bhakti Chauhan as Patralekha Patni

References

Sarabhai vs Sarabhai
Sarabhai vs Sarabhai
Fictional Indian people